Champakulam Kalloorkadu St. Mary's Basilica (Malayalam: ചമ്പക്കുളം വലിയ പള്ളി) is an ancient Christian Church in Kerala. It belongs to the Syro-Malabar Church under the Archeparchy of Changanacherry. It is a Forane church, with several parishes under it.

History
Champakulam Kalloorkadu St. Mary's Basilica  (also called Champakulam Valia Palli) is one of the oldest Christian churches in India
and the mother church of almost all Catholic Syrian churches in Alleppey District. Believed to be established in AD 427, the church was rebuilt many times. Champakulam church was once under Niranam Church, which was founded by the Apostle Saint Thomas himself. The many rock inscriptions found around the church tell us about the history of the church. 

The open air Rock Cross at Champakulam church is one of the most ancient crosses with clear documentation of its antiquity, dating to AD 1151. There are many archaeological artifacts found around the church that tell more about its history.  Champakulam Church had very friendly relations with the Puthenkoottukar and had a pivotal role in many ecumenical efforts in the eighteenth century. Ikkako Kathanar, one of the martyrs (nasranis) of East Syriac Catholics, was born in this parish.

Champakulam church has been recognized by the Universal Church as a Basilica. On 27 November 2016, the church was officially declared as a basilica by Pope Francis and Mar Joseph Perumthottam, the Metropolitan Archbishop of Changanacherry. This is the first basilica in the archdiocese of Changanasserry, the fourth in the Syro Malabar Church, the ninth in Kerala and the twenty-third basilica in India.

Over the years, the church has undergone significant updates. Initially, there was a small parish hall with about hundred seats. A few years back, a bigger Parish Hall was constructed.
The latest, inaugurated on 3 January 2011, has 800+ seats. St. Mary's Theological Center was inaugurated in 2011 as well.

The Church At Glance

 Parish  :  Champakulam
 Forane  :  Champakulam
 Diocese :  Changanacherry
 Patron  :  St. Mary
 First Church :  AD 427
 Priests  :  4
 Vicar :Very Rev. Fr. Kadathukalam Abraham 
 Asst.Vicars: Fr. Kakkaparampil Antony and Fr. Rino John SVD
 Catholic Population  :  6500
 Catholic Families  :  1378
 Phone :  0477-2736252

Holy Qurbana Timings
 Sundays : 6.00AM, 7.30AM, 9.30AM, 4.00PM
 Other Days : 6.00AM, 7.00AM
 Wednesdays : 6.30AM, 4.00PM

Catholic Organizations 
C.M.L
Altar Boys
Thirubala sakhyam
Yuva Deepti-S.M.Y.M
Mathru Jyothis
Pithru Vedi
St. Vincent De Paul Society
Darsana Smooham
Choir Group

Location (Wikimapia)
 http://wikimapia.org/101750/Champakulam-Kaloorkadu-St-Mary-s-Forane-Church-AD-427

Famous Parishioners
There are many famous parishioners in the history of Kalloorkadu church. One of them is the martyr of the church, Ikkako Kathanar.

Ikkako Kathanar

Ikkako Kathanar was a priest from this parish who became martyr in the hand of Portuguese for protecting the East Syriac tradition of the indigenous catholic church of India (Nasranis) mainly along the malabar coast. Till the arrival of  Europeans Nasranis were belonging to the East Syriac rites in the Catholic Church. The Europeans under the Padroado and Propaganda tried to forcefully convert the nasranis into western or Latin rite. Ikkako Kathanar is one of the faithful of the church who tried to resist this illegal attempt which extended over more than five centuries. He attained martyrdom under the hands of propaganda carmelites during this.

Annual Feasts
Apart from general Christian Holy celebrations like Christmas, Good Friday & Easter (Holy week) etc., there are two main yearly feasts (മലയാളം: പെരുന്നാള്‍).

Feast of Mother Mary / Marian apparition(ദര്‍ശനതിരുന്നാള്‍)

The Feast of the Apparition lasts for 11 days of pious celebrations and concludes on the Sunday following 15 October.

Commemoration of the Death of St. Joseph (യൌസേപ്പ് പിതാവിന്റെ മരണ തിരുന്നാള്‍)
This is a 'shradham- Chatham' conducted in commemoration of the death of St. Joseph is held on 19 March every year.  It attracts thousands of devotees to Kalloorkadu Church from far of places.

Moonnu Noyambu Perunnaal of Champakulam

Champakulam Church is one of the ancient churches in which Moonnu Noyambu Perunnaal (Three day fast- Rogation of Ninevites) celebrated regularly which has been discontinued in the recent past. There are clear documentation about the Moonnu noyambu perunaal of champakulam in the records  about the financial  help and support from the Kings of Chempakasserry for the feast.

Parishes Under Champakulam Forane
 Champakulam (Kalloorkad) St. Mary's Syro-Malabar Catholic Church 	0477-2736252
 Kondackal St. Joseph's Syro-Malabar Catholic Church 	0477-2736216
 Pullangady Holy Family Syro-Malabar Catholic Church 	0477-2736346
 Thekkekara St. John's Syro-Malabar Catholic Church 	0477-2707031
 Vadakkeamichakari St. George's Syro-Malabar Catholic Church 	0477-2707075
 Vaisyambhagam St. Antony's Syro-Malabar Catholic Church 	0477-2736501
 St. Joseph's Syro-Malabar Catholic Church, Chennamkary 	0477-2724237
 Kandankary St. Joseph's Syro-Malabar Catholic Church 	0477-2737125
 Narbonapuram St. Sebastian's Syro-Malabar Catholic Church 	0477-2762205
 Nazareth St. Jerome's Syro-Malabar Catholic Church 	0477-2762205
 Sleevapuram Syro-Malabar Catholic Church(Ponga) 	0477-2762188
 Chennamkary Lourdes Matha Syro-Malabar Catholic Church  	0477-
 Padaharam St.Joseph's Syro-Malabar Catholic Church

Institutions under the Parish

Religious Houses In the Parish
 St.Martin Chapel 
 Gagultha Ashram CMI
 SABS (The Congregation of the sisters of the Adoration of the Blessed Sacrament) Convent.
 SABS was founded on 8 December 1908 at Champakulam in Kerala. It had its origin in the personal experience of the Eucharistic presence of the servant of God Thomas Kurialacherry (1873-1925) the first bishop of Changanacherry.
 Kurialasserry Bhavan (SABS)
 Clara madhom & Orphanage for young girls, Kondakkal.

Other institutions under the Parish
St. Mary's LP School
St. Mary's High School
St. Mary's Higher Secondary School Champakulam
St. Joseph's Mission Hospital

Gallery

References

External links

 https://archive.today/20110111102440/http://www.smcim.smonline.org/kalloorkadu/
 St. Mary's Church

Churches in Alappuzha district
Syro-Malabar Catholic church buildings
5th-century establishments in India
Basilica churches in India